Susan Eichhorn Young is a Canadian-American soprano, actress, voice-over artist, voice teacher, and writer.


Biography
Eichhorn Young, who now lives and works in New York City, is a native of the Canadian Prairies,  and holds a bachelor of music degree in voice performance from the University of Saskatchewan and a master's degree in Voice Performance and Literature from the University of Western Ontario. She also holds three diplomas from the Royal Conservatory of Music in piano performance, voice performance and vocal pedagogy. She has studied privately with Irish soprano Norma Burrowes, as well as Dorothy Howard (US), Dr Carol Anderson, Wayne Sanders of Opera Ebony, Jane Klaviter of the Metropolitan Opera, Theodore Baerg of Don Wright Faculty of Music, and Irena Welhasch-Baerg of the Canadian Opera Company.

Eichhorn Young teaches in North and South America, Europe, and Asia.  She is now worldwide via online platforms and in person in NYC.

Her operatic roles have included Purcell's Dido, the Countess in Mozart's The Marriage of Figaro, Fiordiligi in Così fan tutte, Musetta in Puccini's La bohème, and the title role in Suor Angelica. She has performed in theatrical works by Stephen Sondheim and Kurt Weill, as well as Rodgers and Hart, Cole Porter, Irving Berlin, George Gershwin, Jerry Herman, Leonard Bernstein, and many others. As a cabaret performer, she gave the world premiere of Modern Love Songs by Chester Biscardi. Her album, Taking My Turn, recorded with music director and pianist Alan Johnson and produced by Grammy Award-winning tenor Thomas Young, is a collection of cabaret songs with repertoire by Stephen Sondheim, William Bolcom, Francis Poulenc and Kurt Weill. A near-fatal car accident in 2011 necessitated a long recovery period for Eichorn Young and her husband. She returned to the stage in her one-woman show, WHY?, at the Laurie Beechman Theatre in November 2016, and again in April, 2017.

Eichhorn Young has directed Mozart's The Magic Flute, Bernstein's Trouble in Tahiti, and Kander and Ebb's Cabaret. She has been a vocal consultant to the band Less Than Treason and for the RCA recording/PBS Great Performances of Tenors: Cook Dixon & Young.

Susan Eichhorn Young writes a popular online blog about life as a teacher and artist. She is married to tenor Thomas Young.

References

External links
 
 "Vocal Styles: An Interview with Susan Eichhorn Young", Claudia Friedlander, The Liberated Voice, 2 August 2010

Living people
Year of birth missing (living people)
Musicians from Saskatchewan
Canadian operatic sopranos
Cabaret performers
Voice teachers
Singers from New York City